Adolphoduckea is a genus of flowering plants belonging to the family Rubiaceae.

Its name is honour to brazilian botanist Adolpho Ducke.

Its native range is Western Southern America to Northern Brazil.

Species:

Adolphoduckea maynensis

References

Rubiaceae
Rubiaceae genera